Gaja is a 2008 Indian Kannada-language  action romance  film directed by K. Madesh. The film stars Darshan and Devaraj. Producers of the film claimed that the film is based on a story by novelist P. Ramachandra Rao(Chandu). The film is a remake of the 2005 Telugu film Bhadra. The movie was also dubbed into Hindi as Gajja Thakur.

Plot
Gaja (Darshan) and Krishna are friends. Gaja goes out to Krishna's village for a holiday but finds some startling events happening. He finds that Krishna's brother Devendra has a running feud with a rival faction, which prevents a harmonious relationship between the two families. But Gaja becomes a darling of Devendra's family and he also takes a liking to Shwetha (Navya Nair), the sister of Devendra.

But in a faction fight later Devendra is killed along with his wife. Gaja tries to save the situation, but when he finds that the entire family of Devendra has become a target, he wants to run away with his friend Krishna and Shwetha. The rival faction leader's brother will kill Krishna and in a retaliatory mood Gaja kills him. He then escapes to Bangalore along with Shwetha. And then a cat and mouse game starts with Gaja being hounded by the rival faction leaders. Finally Gaja wins the battle.

Cast
Darshan as Gaja alias Gajendra Moorthi 
Navya Nair as Shwetha
Devaraj as Devendra, Shwetha's eldest brother
Sourav as Krishna, Shwetha's brother
Pradeep Rawat as soorapa
Shobaraj as Shivanna, Devendra's brother
Bhavya 
Ashalatha 
Deepa Iyer 
Sangeetha 
Nischitha Gowda as Gaja's cousin
Thejaswini
Ravi Chetan
Komal as Gaja's friend
Ekta Khosla as Satya
Chitra Shenoy
Master Hirannaiah as Gaja's grandfather
Srinath as Gaja's father
Subbaraju
Sathyajith
Ravi Varma 
Chinnayya 
Tharakesh Patel 
Aruna Balaraj 
Jaidev 
 Bhanu Prakash 
Rakhi Savanth 
Stunt Siddu 
Lamboo Nagesh 
Hulivana Gangadharayya 
Malathi Sardeshpande 
Shobha Raghavendra

Soundtrack 
The soundtrack was composed by V. Harikrishna. All lyrics were written by V. Nagendra Prasad.

Critical reception
Sify gave the film a rating of 4/5 and praised the role of acting, music and the camera departments in the film. R G Vijayasarathy of Rediff.com  scored the film at 2 out of 5 stars and says "Gaja's main strength is the music of Harikrishna and rich production values. Cameraman Ramesh Babu has to be complimented for his efforts. The songs Maathu Nannolu, Lambooji
Lambooji, and Aithalakadi' are very well choreographed.  And so are the fights. The only thumbs down to Gaja is the director and producer's claim that their film is an original."

Release 
Gaja was released on 11 January 2008. It was certified as 'A' by the censor board. It completed over 100 days at the box office, and became a comeback film for Darshan after huge flops. "Bul Bul" and Gaja title song became chartbusters.

References

External links 
 

Films set in Bangalore
2000s Kannada-language films
2008 films
Kannada remakes of Telugu films
Films scored by V. Harikrishna